"Duel" is the second single by German pop group Propaganda. The song was included on their first album, A Secret Wish.

Released in the United Kingdom in April 1985, it became their most successful single in the UK, reaching no. 21. This led to the band making their sole appearance on the flagship BBC music programme, Top of the Pops, in June of that year. Drums and percussion were provided by Stewart Copeland.

Alternative version - Jewel

"Duel" was originally released with an alternative version of the track, "Jewel (Rough Cut)" as the B-side. It features the same lyrics delivered in a more aggressive manner, mainly by Susanne Freytag, over a backing track of heavy beats and industrial sound effects.

A 12-inch mix, "Jewel (Cut Rough)" extended this with further sound effects, and an instrumental version appeared on the group's debut album, A Secret Wish.

The two approaches to the song were combined in two different tracks. "Bejewelled" played the song through, alternating between the two versions, while "Jewelled", on the remix album Wishful Thinking, combined elements of both, with the melodies of "Duel" playing alongside the rhythms of "Jewel".

Charts

Weekly charts

Year-end charts

Use as a sports theme
The song is often played at the stadium of Heart Of Midlothian Football Club during home matches. A remix, "Jewelled", was also used as the title and credits music of the BBC programme Rally Report (later Top Gear Rally Report) covering the Lombard RAC Rally (now called Rally GB) which is the UK round of the World Rally Championship. The instrumental was also used as the sport "bed" by BBC Radio 1 on the evening news report News90, News91, and News92.

An instrumental section of "Duel" was used in the mid-to-late 1980s by Australian Television Network's sports section "7 Sport" as an intro theme for their coverage of the Australian Touring Car Championship and the 1988 Goodyear NASCAR 500 which was quite long as the presenter/main commentator also used the timing of the intro to advise the viewers as the contents of the program as well as the races themselves.

In the UK, "Jewel" was also used by Channel 4 for its American football coverage in the late 1980s and by Granada Television for its regional Granada Goals Extra programme in the early 1990s.

Cover versions
This song was covered (as a Spanish translation called "Hoy comienza tu derrota") by Venezuelan singer Melissa, for her 1986 album Melissa III.

British singer Mandy Smith recorded a cover version of "Duel" for her debut album Mandy in 1988.

In August 2007, Sophie Ellis-Bextor recorded and released a cover of "Duel" as the B-side to her single, "Today the Sun's on Us".

In 2009, UK girl group Dolly Rockers sampled the bridge and melody from "Duel" to form the basis for their song, "How Did I End Up with U".

References

External links
 "Duel" discography at ZTT and All That

1985 singles
Sophie Ellis-Bextor songs
Propaganda (band) songs
Song recordings produced by Stephen Lipson
1985 songs